Aleksandr Panov (born January 13, 1946) is a former Russian handball player who competed for the Soviet Union in the 1972 Summer Olympics.

In 1972 he was part of the Soviet team which finished fifth in the Olympic tournament. He played all six matches and scored 15 goals.

References

1946 births
Living people
Soviet male handball players
Russian male handball players
Olympic handball players of the Soviet Union
Handball players at the 1972 Summer Olympics